Rosa M. Miró-Roig (born August 6, 1960) is a professor of mathematics at the University of Barcelona, specializing in algebraic geometry and commutative algebra. She did her graduate studies at the University of Barcelona, earning a Ph.D. in 1985 under the supervision of Sebastià Xambó-Descamps with a thesis entitled Haces reflexivos sobre espacios proyectivos.

Books and editing 
Miró-Roig has authored and co-authored three mathematics research volumes. Most recently, she co-authored On the Shape of a Pure O-sequence (American Mathematical Society 2012) with Mats Boij, Juan C. Migliore, Uwe Nagel, and Fabrizio Zanello. Previously, she authored the research text Determinantal Ideals (Birkhäuser 2007) and co-authored the monograph Gorenstein Liaison, Complete Intersection Liaison Invariants and Unobstructedness (American Mathematical Society 2001) with Jan O. Kleppe, Juan C. Migliore, Uwe Nagel, and Chris Peterson.

Miró-Roig is the Chief Editor of the mathematics research journal Collectanea Mathematica (Springer). Also, she is on the editorial boards of the mathematics research journals Beiträge zur Algebra und Geometrie (Springer) and Journal of Commutative Algebra (Rocky Mountain Mathematics Consortium). Furthermore, she co-edited the mathematics research volumes Projective Varieties with Unexpected Properties (De Gruyter 2008) with Ciro Ciliberto, Antony V. Geramita, Brian Harbourne, and Kristian Ranestad, European Congress of Mathematics: Barcelona, July 10–14, 2000 (Birkhäuser 2001) two volumes with Carles Casacuberta, Joan Verdera, and Sebastià Xambó-Descamps, Six Lectures on Commutative Algebra (Birkhäuser 1998) with J. Elias, J. M. Giral, and S. Zarzuela, and Complex Analysis and Geometry (Chapman and Hall/CRC 1997) with V. Ancona, E. Ballico, and A. Silva

Recognition 
In 2007, Miró-Roig was awarded the Ferran Sunyer i Balaguer Prize for her work "Determinantal Ideals (Birkhäuser, 2007)".

References

1960 births
Living people
20th-century Spanish mathematicians
Women mathematicians
Algebraic geometers
University of Barcelona alumni
Academic staff of the University of Barcelona
21st-century Spanish mathematicians